CADPAC, the Cambridge Analytic Derivatives Package, is a suite of programs for ab initio computational chemistry calculations. It has been developed by R. D. Amos with contributions from I. L. Alberts, J. S. Andrews, S. M. Colwell, N. C. Handy, D. Jayatilaka, P. J. Knowles, R. Kobayashi, K. E. Laidig, G. Laming, A. M. Lee, P. E. Maslen, C. W. Murray, J. E. Rice, E. D. Simandiras, A. J. Stone, M.-D. Su and D. J. Tozer. at Cambridge University since 1981. It is capable of molecular Hartree–Fock calculations, Møller–Plesset calculations, various other correlated calculations and density functional theory calculations.

See also 
 Quantum chemistry computer programs

External links 
 

Computational chemistry software